NxStage Medical, Inc. Is an American company that develops, manufactures, and markets systems for the treatment of chronic kidney disease, acute kidney injury, and hypervolemia. It is a subsidiary of Fresenius Medical Care. System One, a portable hemodialysis system, is the company's primary product.

History
The company was founded by C. David Finch, Jr., MD and Jeffrey H. Burbank in December 1998.

In 2003, the company launched System One in the critical care market. It received Food and Drug Administration clearance for home hemodialysis in June 2005.

In October 2005, the company became a public company via an initial public offering.

On November 2, 2005, the company received the Nixon Peabody/Smith & Nephew Medical Device Innovation Award in the Start-Up category from the Massachusetts Medical Device Industry Council (MassMEDIC).

In December 2014, the company received Food and Drug Administration clearance for System One to be used overnight while patients are sleeping.

In August 2017, the company received Food and Drug Administration clearance for System One for solo home hemodialysis, without a care partner, during waking hours.

In February 2019, the company was acquired by Fresenius Medical Care.

References

External links
 

American companies established in 1998
Health care companies established in 1998
Health care companies based in Massachusetts
1998 establishments in Massachusetts
2005 initial public offerings
2019 mergers and acquisitions
Companies based in Lawrence, Massachusetts
Companies formerly listed on the Nasdaq
Medical device manufacturers
Medical technology companies of the United States
American subsidiaries of foreign companies